Mabian Yi Autonomous County is a county of Sichuan Province, China. It is under the administration of Leshan city. In 2020 it had a population of 188,251. The population is 50.7% Yi minority people. Mabian is known throughout China for its green tea. Other local agricultural products are Gastrodia and bamboo shoots.

Mabian's Dafengding National Nature Reserve is home to giant pandas. Other touristic sites include traditional Yi villages.

Administrative divisions 
Mabian has jurisdiction over 12 towns and 3 townships:

Towns

 Minjian (民建镇), county seat
 Rongding (荣丁镇)
 Xiaxi (下溪镇)
 Suba (苏坝镇)
 Yanfeng (烟峰镇)
 Laodong (劳动镇)
 Qiaoba (荍坝镇)
 Jianshe (建设镇)
 Minzhu (民主镇)
 Meilin (梅林镇)
 Xuekoushan (雪口山镇)
 Sanhekou (三河口镇)

Townships

 Dazhubao (大竹堡乡)
 Gaozhuoying (高卓营乡)
 Yonghong (永红乡)

Climate

People from Mabian 
 He Changchun (贺昌群), historian (1903-1973)

References

County-level divisions of Sichuan
Yi autonomous counties
Leshan